The Willis Building is a commercial skyscraper in London named after the primary tenant, Willis Group. It is located on Lime Street in the City of London financial district.

The building was designed by Norman Foster and developed by British Land.

History
The Willis Building was constructed between 2004 and 2008 under the management of Mace and represented a significant addition to the City of London skyline, becoming its fourth-tallest building after Tower 42, 30 St Mary Axe and CityPoint. The core was topped out in July 2006 and the steelwork completed in September that year. Cladding began in July 2006 and the structure was externally completed by June 2007. It was internally fitted out and officially opened in April 2008.

The building was the first in a wave of new tall towers for London's primary financial district. Others included 22 Bishopsgate, the Leadenhall Building and the Heron Tower.

Gallery

See also

List of tallest buildings and structures in London
20 Fenchurch Street
The Scalpel
St. Helen's
Willis Tower

References

External links

Official website
Timelapse video of the building's construction from March 2005 – May 2007
Construction details on the curtain wall façades
Building.co.uk article
Project description – Climaveneta Official website

Skyscrapers in the City of London
Buildings and structures in the City of London
Skyscraper office buildings in London
Foster and Partners buildings
Office buildings completed in 2008